Maya Kuzminichna Kopitseva (May 18, 1924, in Gagry, Abkhazia, USSR – June 6, 2005, in Saint Petersburg) was a Soviet Russian still-life painter and an Honored Artist of the RSFSR who lived and worked in Leningrad - Saint Petersburg. She was a member of the Saint Petersburg Union of Artists, which before 1992 was the Leningrad branch of Union of Artists of the Russian Federation, and was regarded as one of the major representatives of the Leningrad school of painting.

Biography 
Maya Kuzminichna Kopitseva was born on 18 May 1924 in Gagry, Abkhazia, USSR. In 1951 she graduated from the Ilya Repin Institute in Boris Ioganson's workshop and among her teachers were Boris Fogel, Leonid Ovsiannikov and Alexander Zaytsev. Since 1951 Maya Kopitseva has participated in several art exhibitions, displaying still lifes, portraits, genre scenes and sketches done from life.

In 1951 Kopitseva became a member of the Saint Petersburg Union of Artists and in 2001 was awarded the honorary title of Honored Artist of the Russian Federation. She was a wife of well-known Russian painter and art educator Anatoli Levitin, a People's Artist of the USSR.

Kopitseva died of thyroid cancer in Saint Petersburg in 2005. Paintings by her reside in the Russian Museum, in public art museums and private collections in Russia, Italy, the U.S.A, Japan, China, France and elsewhere.

See also
 List of 20th-century Russian painters
 List of painters of Saint Petersburg Union of Artists
 List of Russian artists

References

Bibliography 
 L' École de Leningrad. Auction Catalogue. Paris, Drouot Richelieu, 11 Juin 1990. P.132-133.
 Charmes Russes. Catalogue. Paris, Drouot Richelieu, 15 Mai 1991. P.73.
 Saint-Pétersbourg — Pont-Audemer. Dessins, Gravures, Sculptures et Tableaux du XX siècle du fonds de L' Union des Artistes de Saint-Pétersbourg. Pont-Audemer, 1994. P.89,93,108.
 Matthew C. Bown. Dictionary of 20th Century Russian and Soviet Painters 1900-1980s. - London: Izomar, 1998. , .
 Sergei V. Ivanov. Unknown Socialist Realism. The Leningrad School.- Saint Petersburg: NP-Print Edition, 2007. – pp. 9, 15, 20, 21, 24, 362, 388-397, 399-401, 404-407. , .
 Академическая дача. Каталог выставки. СПб., Санкт-Петербургский Союз художников, 2009. — с.2,4,13.
 Левитин А. П. Майя Копытцева. Художник. Личность. Друг. СПб., Левша, 2010. .
 Иванов С. Тихая жизнь за ленинградским столом // Петербургские искусствоведческие тетради. Выпуск 23. СПб., 2012. С.90-97.
 Логвинова Е. Круглый стол по ленинградскому искусству в галерее АРКА // Петербургские искусствоведческие тетради. Вып. 31. СПб, 2014. С.17-26.

1924 births
2005 deaths
20th-century Russian painters
21st-century Russian painters
Deaths from cancer in Russia
Deaths from thyroid cancer
Honored Artists of the Russian Federation
Leningrad School artists
Leningrad Secondary Art School alumni
Members of the Leningrad Union of Artists
Repin Institute of Arts alumni
Socialist realist artists
Russian women painters
Soviet painters
Russian still life painters
20th-century Russian women artists
21st-century Russian women artists